Laurent Clerc (born 12 April 1972) is a Swiss sprinter. He competed in the men's 400 metres at the 1996 Summer Olympics.

References

1972 births
Living people
Athletes (track and field) at the 1996 Summer Olympics
Athletes (track and field) at the 2000 Summer Olympics
Swiss male sprinters
Olympic athletes of Switzerland
Place of birth missing (living people)